Bellevue Historic District, also known as Cottontown, is a national historic district located at Columbia, South Carolina.  The district encompasses 177 contributing buildings in a planned suburban residential development. They were built between the early 20th century and 1945, and the district includes examples of Tudor Revival, Colonial Revival, and Craftsman/Bungalow style architecture.

It was added to the National Register of Historic Places in 1997.

References

Historic districts on the National Register of Historic Places in South Carolina
Houses on the National Register of Historic Places in South Carolina
Tudor Revival architecture in South Carolina
Colonial Revival architecture in South Carolina
Houses in Columbia, South Carolina
National Register of Historic Places in Columbia, South Carolina